Arrowhead Park Early College High School and Medical Academy is a high school in Las Cruces, New Mexico. It is the newest high school inside Doña Ana County. The school specializes in graduating its students with at least a two-year college degree. The school opened in July 2010 and has 311 students as of most current data. There is a 26.92 student/teacher ratio. It is a part of Las Cruces Public Schools.

Entrance 
In order to be accepted into either the STEM school or Medical Academy the students must go through an application process in the winter of their eighth grade year. 
Roughly 90 students are enrolled each year from this application process.

Purpose 
The school was formed by Las Cruces Public Schools due to overcrowding at the four high schools in the city of Las Cruces. It was also formed as an alternative to the other 4 schools.

References

Public high schools in New Mexico
Schools in Doña Ana County, New Mexico